Into the Maelstrom is an adventure module for the Dungeons & Dragons fantasy role-playing game, set in that game's Mystara campaign setting. TSR, Inc. published the module in 1985 for the D&D Master Set rules. It is part of the "M" series of modules. The module was designed by Bruce and Beatrice Heard. Its cover art is by Jeff Easley, with interior art by Valerie Valusek and cartography by Dave LaForce.

Plot summary
Into the Maelstrom is an adventure scenario in which the player characters lead a fleet of magical flying ships against an evil invading force.

The player characters are playthings of the gods as the strive to increase their power. The kingdom of Norwold is plagued by a gray-green poisonous fog that kills everything in its path and acid rain that creates dry barren soil. The player characters are summoned to the king's court, along with other soldiers and fleets, with the intention of attacking the prime suspect country. While crossing the ocean, the fleet is caught in a maelstrom that is really a gate to the Star Kingdoms. From there, the fleet must struggle to reach the Magic Mist, a gate home to a strange island spewing gray-green mist into the air. On the island, the party confront the roaring demon Alphaks.

Table of contents

Publication history
M1 Into the Maelstrom was written by Bruce and Beatrice Heard, with a cover by Jeff Easley, and was published by TSR in 1985 as a 32-page booklet with an outer folder. The central part of the plot, travelling through the first part of the Star Kingdom, is heavily inspired by Homer's Odyssey.

Credits
Design: Bruce Heard and Beatrice Heard
Cover Art: Jeff Easley
Illustrations: Valerie Valusek 
Cartography: Dave LaForce 
Typesetting: Betty Elmore

Distributed to the book trade in the United States by Random House, Inc., and in Canada by Random House of Canada, Ltd. Distributed to the toy and hobby trade by regional distributors. Distributed in the United Kingdom by TSR UK Ltd., product number 9159.

See also
 List of Dungeons & Dragons modules

References

Dungeons & Dragons modules
Mystara
Role-playing game supplements introduced in 1985